During the 2009–10 season, the Bracknell Bees participated in the semi-professional English Premier Ice Hockey League.

Results
Legend:

September

October

November

December

External links
Official Bracknell Bees website

Sport in Bracknell
2009–10 in English ice hockey